Man with a Movie Camera is a 1929 Soviet silent documentary film.

Man with a Movie Camera may also refer to:
 Man with a Movie Camera (Biosphere album), a 2001 ambient soundtrack for the film
 Man with a Movie Camera (The Cinematic Orchestra album), a 2003 jazz electronica soundtrack for the film

See also
 Man with a Camera, an American television crime drama starring Charles Bronson